The 2019 Houston Dash season is the team's sixth season as an American professional women's soccer team in the National Women's Soccer League. James Clarkson was appointed head coach on December 11, 2018 after Vera Pauw departed the team after only one season.

Roster

Competitions

Regular season

Regular-season standings

Results summary

Results by round

Statistical leaders

Top scorers

Top assists

Shutouts

Awards

NWSL Weekly Awards

NWSL Goal of the Week

NWSL Save of the Week

Player Transactions

2019 NWSL College Draft

 Source: National Women's Soccer League

In

Out

References

External links

See also
 2019 National Women's Soccer League season
 2019 in American soccer

Houston Dash
Houston Dash
Houston Dash seasons